Kalininite (ZnCr2S4) is a thiospinel mineral found in Russia in 1985 in the Pereval Marble Quarry, Slyudyanka (Sludyanka), Lake Baikal area, Irkutskaya Oblast', Prebaikalia (Pribaikal'e), Eastern-Siberian Region. It was named for P. V. Kalinin, Russian mineralogist and petrologist, investigator of the southern Baikal region.

References 

Mindat
Webmineral
Handbook of Mineralogy

Chromium minerals
Zinc minerals
Thiospinel group
Geology of Russia
Cubic minerals
Minerals in space group 227
Minerals described in 1985